Titia Wilmink (born 01 October 1968) is a former professional Dutch tennis player.

Wilmink made her WTA Tour main-draw debut at the 1989 Citizen Cup, in the doubles event, partnering Julie Salmon.

ITF Circuit finals

Singles (0–3)

Doubles (6–6)

External links
 
 

1968 births
Living people
Dutch female tennis players
20th-century Dutch women
21st-century Dutch women